Richard Lawrence may refer to:

Richard Lawrence (failed assassin) (c. 1800–1861), attempted to assassinate U.S. President Andrew Jackson
Richard Lawrence (bobsleigh) (1906–1974), American athlete; bronze medal winner at the 1936 Winter Olympics
Richard Lawrence (art director)
Richard Lawrence (cricketer), English cricketer 
Richard Lawrence (politician) (1942–2022), American politician
Richard D. Lawrence (1930–2016), U.S. Army general
Richard Lawrence, Labour candidate for Ecclesall in the Sheffield City Council election, 2012

See also 
Lawrence Ricks - former American football player
Richard Laurence (1760–1838), Church of Ireland Archbishop of Cashel